The Men's double trap event at the 2010 South American Games was held on March 24 at 9:00.

Individual

Medalists

Results

Qualification

Final

Team

Medalists

Results

References
Qualification
Final
Team

Double Trap M